"Naked" is a song by Goo Goo Dolls. The song was the fourth single released from their hit album A Boy Named Goo after they scored a breakthrough hit with the previous single "Name".

Track listing

"Naked" (Goo version) - 4:06
"Naked" (album Goo version) - 3:43

Charts

References

1995 singles
Goo Goo Dolls songs
1995 songs
Songs written by John Rzeznik
Warner Records singles
Songs written by Robby Takac